Hennings is a surname. Notable people with the surname include:

Artur Hennings (1940–2003), German chess master
Chad Hennings (born 1965), American football defensive lineman
Emmy Hennings (1885–1948), German performer and poet
Ernest Martin Hennings (1886–1956), American painter, member of Taos Society of Artists
John Hennings (c. 1833–1898), theatrical scene painter in Australia
Margit Hennings (born 1943), Austrian chess master
Rouwen Hennings (born 1987), German football player
Thomas C. Hennings Jr. (1903-1960), American politician, Congressional Representative and Senator from Missouri
Andrew Hennings and Kate Hennings, fictional characters
Sam Hennings, American Actor